Parliamentary elections were held in Ghana on 29 December 1992, the first since 1979. Voter turnout was just 28.1% amidst a boycott by opposition parties, who had claimed the preceding presidential elections in November – won by former military ruler Jerry Rawlings with 58% of the vote – were fraudulent, with international observers considering them not to have been conducted in a free and fair manner.

The result was a victory for Rawlings's National Democratic Congress, which won 189 of the 200 seats.

Results
A total of 8,229,902 voters were registered, but 893,056 were in the 23 constituencies that were uncontested.

By region

See also
List of Ghana Parliament constituencies
List of MPs elected in the 1992 Ghanaian parliamentary election

References

External links and sources
 Elected Parliamentarians - 1992 Elections, Electoral Commission of Ghana, Archived from original on 12 January 2011

Elections in Ghana
Ghana
Parliamentary election
Election and referendum articles with incomplete results